"You've Got a Friend in Me" is a song by Randy Newman. Used as the theme song for the 1995 Disney/Pixar animated film Toy Story, it has since become a major musical component for its sequels, Toy Story 2 (1999), Toy Story 3 (2010) and Toy Story 4 (2019) as well as a musical leitmotif throughout the whole Toy Story franchise. The song was nominated for both the Academy Award for Best Original Song and the Golden Globe Award for Best Original Song, but lost both to "Colors of the Wind" from Disney's Pocahontas.

Like many other Disney theme songs, "You've Got a Friend in Me" has been covered numerous times. Cover versions featured in the first three Toy Story films include a duet with Newman and Lyle Lovett in Toy Story;  a diagetic instance by Tom Hanks, a version by Robert Goulet and an instrumental by Tom Scott in Toy Story 2, and a Spanish language version by the Gipsy Kings in Toy Story 3.

In Toy Story
The song is played during the opening credits for Toy Story, Toy Story 3, and Toy Story 4, establishing the importance of Woody and Andy in the first film and the importance of all his toys in the third and fourth. Toy Story 3 also uses it for irony and dramatic effect, as the opening credits harken back to the first film and the song abruptly fades out with "And as the years go by, our friendship will never die", before showing that Andy's remaining toys in the present day are boxed up and unused. When they were unused, Andy was 17 years old. In Toy Story 4, the song is heard during the opening montage, that features Andy playing with Woody, giving him to Bonnie as a teenager, and Bonnie playing with him, but soon starting to neglect him.

In two sequels, the song is listened to by the characters as part of the story, as cover versions done at the end of the film for thematic reasons: at the end of Toy Story 2, the character Wheezy starts to sing it to the other toys in the style of Frank Sinatra; during the end credits of Toy Story 3, Buzz Lightyear and Jessie (now a couple) perform a pasodoble to a Spanish version of the song, deliberately played by Jessie to get Buzz to dance.

The most significant use of the song was in the third act of Toy Story 2, where an episode of Woody's Roundup (the fictional 1950s puppet show he was based on) shows the puppet Woody singing the song, directed at the young audience and featuring a small child hugging the puppet. Woody sees this and has an epiphany, realizing that his mission as a toy is to be there for a child. (In-universe, the song was presumably written for Woody's Roundup.)

The Woody's Roundup version was performed by Tom Hanks, with acoustic guitar backing; Wheezy's version was sung by Robert Goulet (though the character was voiced by Joe Ranft); and the Spanish version, "You've Got a Friend in Me (Para el Buzz Español)", was performed by the Gipsy Kings.

Personnel

Original version 

 Randy Newman – lead vocals, piano,  orchestral arrangements
 Randy Kerber – keyboards
 John Goux, Dean Parks – guitars
 Jimmy Johnson – bass
 Jim Keltner – drums
 Yvonne Williams, Bobbi Page, Luana Jackman – background vocals

Duet version 

 Randy Newman – lead vocals, piano
 Lyle Lovett – co-lead vocals
 Kevin Savigar – Hammond B-3
 Mark Goldenberg – guitar
 James Hutchinson – bass
 Jim Keltner – drums
 Gabe Witcher – violin

Chart performance

Certifications

Release history

Cover versions
It was performed by George Jones and Kathy Mattea on The Best of Country Sing the Best of Disney.
In 2006, Steve Tyrell and Dr. John did a duet of the song on Tyrell's CD  "The Disney Standards".
Michael Bublé covered "You've Got a Friend in Me" on his 2013 album, To Be Loved.  The track became a U.S. Adult Contemporary chart hit, spending 14 weeks on the chart and peaking at number 10.
A remix of "You've Got a Friend in Me" was released on April 22, 2014, by Alfred Montejanhyper on the remix album Dconstructed.
On May 31, 2018, Rex Orange County released a cover of "You've Got a Friend in Me", performing along with Randy Newman, the creator of the song.
An instrumental remix of "You've Got a Friend in Me" plays in the Toy Box world of Kingdom Hearts III, arranged by Yoko Shimomura and released in 2019. The track also appears as a playable stage in Kingdom Hearts: Melody of Memory.
On December 13, 2019, a cover by Cavetown was published on YouTube and released all streaming platforms.
A covered version of the song appears in Just Dance 2021.

References

External links
 Best Song Academy Award Nominations - Newman
 , Pixar press release, May 2, 2005. (Archived from the original on May 7, 2005.)
 

Film theme songs
Songs about friendship
1995 songs
1995 singles
1996 singles
1990s ballads
Songs from Toy Story
Lyle Lovett songs
Walt Disney Records singles
Songs written by Randy Newman
Randy Newman songs
Male vocal duets